Boon Township may refer to the following places in the United States:

 Boon Township, Indiana
 Boon Township, Michigan
 Boon Lake Township, Minnesota

See also 
 Boone Township (disambiguation)